The Lombard Automobile Buildings, located in northwest Portland, Oregon, are listed on the National Register of Historic Places.

See also
 National Register of Historic Places listings in Northwest Portland, Oregon

References

External links
 

1915 establishments in Oregon
Buildings and structures completed in 1915
Buildings designated early commercial in the National Register of Historic Places
Joseph Jacobberger buildings
National Register of Historic Places in Portland, Oregon
Pearl District, Portland, Oregon
Transportation buildings and structures in Portland, Oregon